Urgut is a city in the Samarqand Region of Uzbekistan and the capital of Urgut District. Its population is 65,300 (2016). It is known for the grove of plane trees, some of which are more than 1000 years old. Urgut is located in a mountainous area.

Urgutlik (also known as Urguti in Tajik) people are a subgroup of ethnic Uzbeks who track their ancestry to people from a town of Urgut. There are almost 500,000 people who describe themselves as Urgutlik. Urgutlik people frequently use Tajik words in their daily conversation. Majority of the population speak Tajik and Uzbek.

Urguti people are heavily involved in basic mercantile trading in their respective locations and in farming. In the town craftsmanship is also well-known which has been maintained traditionally throughout the centuries.

Urgut's biggest market with varied and relatively inexpensive merchandise attracts folks even from Samarkand, the capital of the Region.

References

Populated places in Samarqand Region
Cities in Uzbekistan